Electron beam computed tomography (EBCT) is a specific form of computed tomography (CT) in which the X-ray tube is not mechanically spun in order to rotate the source of X-ray photons. This different design was explicitly developed to better image heart structures that never stop moving, performing a complete cycle of movement with each heartbeat.

As in conventional CT technology, the X-ray source-point moves along a circle in space around an object to be imaged. In EBT, however, the X-ray tube itself is large and stationary, and partially surrounds the imaging circle. Rather than moving the tube itself, electron-beam focal point (and hence the X-ray source point) is swept electronically along a tungsten anode in the tube, tracing a large circular arc on its inner surface. This motion can be very fast.

Electron beam CT was unable to compete with more rapid advancement in multidetector CT imager technology and had become completely obsolete by the 2020s.

Advantages and disadvantages

The principal application advantage of EBT machines, and the reason for the invention, is that because the X-ray source-point is swept electronically, not mechanically, it can be swept with far greater speed.

The major medical application for which this design technology was invented in the 1980s was for imaging the human heart, specifically to detect coronary calcium. The heart never stops moving, and some important structures, such as arteries, move several times their diameter during each heartbeat. Rapid imaging is therefore important to prevent blurring of moving structures during the scan. EBT detection of calcium deposits is accurate, fast and involves lower exposure to ionising radiation than conventional CT. Patients are exposed to radiation for a shorter period as it is faster in creating multiple images of the heart. The most advanced current commercial designs can perform image sweeps in as little as 0.025 seconds. By comparison, the fastest mechanically swept X-ray tube designs require about 0.25 seconds to perform an image sweep. For reference, current coronary artery angiography imaging is usually performed at 30 frames/second or 0.033 seconds/frame; EBT is far closer to this than mechanically swept CT machines.

Given the larger size and low production volume of the EBT design, only about 120 existed in the world as of 2004, vs. thousands of more conventional design CT machines. signal-to-noise ratio and spatial resolution are also worse compared to conventional CT.

Design specifics
As in standard X-ray tubes, part of the electron current energy when hitting the tungsten target is converted into photons. However, instead of spinning a small target anode in order to dissipate waste heat, the electron current focus spot is swept along a large stationary target anode.

The electron current sweep is aimed using wound copper coil magnetic deflection yokes, as in a cathode ray tube (CRT). However, the entire structure of the cathode, deflection yokes, anode and overall vacuum tube size is much larger, therefore made out of steel, not glass, with the main central open midsection of the vacuum tube hollow, leaving room for the scan table and object or person to lie while the scan is performed.

Future
Whether the inherent sweep-speed advantage will maintain commercial viability of the EBT design remains unclear at this time. As of 2002, one major company owns and offers models in both competing designs, with engineering cross-pollination of techniques between the product design teams. As of 2005, it increasingly appears that the spiral CT designs, especially those with 64 detector rows, 3×360°/sec rotation speeds, and designed for cardiac imaging, are largely replacing the EBT design from a commercial and medical perspective. However, EBT still offers sweep speeds of effectively 50×360°/sec rotation speeds and lower radiation exposure. The latest version of the EBT eSpeed offers a 33 ms sweep time.

This technology continues to represent the fastest commercial CT temporal resolution.

Since 2008, a single development company has taken the lead on continued development, support and sales of EBT imaging products.  The EBT scanner continues to stay in use globally due to the high accuracy, superior repeatability and ultra low dose abilities over high dose mechanical scanners.

As of the early 2020s EBT imaging had become completely obsolete and had been replaced by multidetector CT imaging everywhere.

References

Electron beam
X-ray computed tomography